Jake Speed is a 1986 American action adventure comedy film directed and produced by Andrew Lane, with Wayne Crawford, and William Fay. It was written by Lane and Crawford, and starred Crawford in the title role, alongside Dennis Christopher, Karen Kopins and John Hurt.

Plot
In Paris, a girl named Maureen Winston (Becca C. Ashley) is abducted by two evil-looking men. While her family prays for her safe return, Maureen's father heaps guilt on her sister Margaret (Karen Kopins), since she convinced her to go see the world. However, Margaret's grandfather (Leon Ames) has an idea: call for Jake Speed (Wayne Crawford) to go and rescue her. One problem exists: Jake Speed is a character in a series of 1940s-style pulp fiction novels.

However, Jake Speed does exist, as Margaret finds out, when he leaves a note for her to meet him and his sidekick, Desmond Floyd (Dennis Christopher), in a tough Paris bar. The novels, as Margaret finds out, are based on Jake and Des's real-life adventures, and they work for nothing, seeing action and excitement (and another novel) as their reward.

Jake reveals that Maureen was kidnapped by white slavers, and is being held in an African country. Jake, Des, and Margaret fly to the nation, which is in the middle of a civil war, to rescue her. Many twists and turns later, Jake's archenemy, the evil, perverted, murderous Englishman Sid (John Hurt), is revealed to be behind the ring, and soon, Margaret becomes a part of it. Jake and Des must now rescue both Maureen and Margaret, stop Sid, and help the girls get out in one piece, while dealing with warring factions, pits of lions, and machine gun-firing helicopters.

Cast 
 Wayne Crawford as Jake Speed
 Dennis Christopher as Desmond Floyd
 Karen Kopins as Margaret Winston
 John Hurt as Sid
 Leon Ames as Pop Winston
 Roy London as Maurice
 Donna Pescow as Wendy
 Barry Primus as Lawrence
 Monte Markham as Mr. Winston
 Millie Perkins as Mrs. Winston
 Ian Yule as Bill Smith

Production
Filming took place in Sherman Oaks, California; Paris, France; and in Zimbabwe. The film was produced by New World Pictures in association with Balcor Film Investors and Force Ten Productions. It was Force Ten's first production since 1978's Paradise Alley.

Soundtrack
A soundtrack of composer Mark Snow's music was released on LP record only by Varèse Sarabande in 1986. It was reissued on compact disc by Buysoundtrax in 2009 in a limited edition pressing of 1000 copies.

A track listing is as follows:

Novelization
A novelization, written under the pseudonym Reno Melon, Jake and Des' pen name, was published on June 1, 1986, by Gold Eagle/Harlequin.

Critical response
Alex Stewart reviewed Jake Speed for White Dwarf #83, and stated that "Until John Hurt turns up, having fun being a sleazy villain, the cast hang about, wondering what to say to each other. The result is surely the dullest and least speedy caper movie ever."

The film holds a 48% rating on Rotten Tomatoes.

References

External links
 
 
 
 

1986 films
1980s action adventure films
1980s adventure comedy films
1980s action comedy films
American action adventure films
American adventure comedy films
Films scored by Mark Snow
Films about kidnapping
Films about prostitution
Films about slavery
Films set in Africa
Films set in Paris
New World Pictures films
1986 comedy films
1980s English-language films
1980s American films